The 1954–55 NCAA men's basketball season began in December 1954, progressed through the regular season and conference tournaments, and concluded with the 1955 NCAA basketball tournament championship game on March 19, 1955, at Municipal Auditorium in Kansas City, Missouri. The San Francisco Dons won their first NCAA national championship with a 77–63 victory over the La Salle Explorers.

Rule changes

 The "one-and-one" free throw was introduced, allowing a player to attempt a second free throw after a foul if he made the first free throw. Previously, a player shot only one free throw after a foul.
 Games once again are divided into two 20-minute halves, as had been the practice through the 1950–51 season. From the 1951–52 season though the 1953–54 season, games had been divided into four 10-minute quarters.

Season headlines 

 The Eastern Intercollegiate Basketball League was disbanded at the end of the season. Its teams, history, and heritage were absorbed into the Ivy League the following season.

Season outlook

Pre-season polls 

The Top 20 from the AP Poll and the UP Coaches Poll during the pre-season.

Arenas 
 Kansas began playing at Allen Fieldhouse late in the season on March 1. The arena was named for their coach at the time Phog Allen. Allen Fieldhouse would eventually become one of the top college basketball home court advantages in the country.

Regular season

Conference winners and tournaments

Statistical leaders

Post-season tournaments

NCAA tournament

Final Four 

 Third Place – Colorado 75, Iowa 54

National Invitation tournament

Semifinals & finals 

 Third Place – Cincinnati 96, St. Francis (Pa.) 91

Awards

Consensus All-American teams

Major player of the year awards 

 Helms Player of the Year: Bill Russell, San Francisco
 UP Player of the Year: Tom Gola, La Salle

Major coach of the year awards 

 UP Coach of the Year: Phil Woolpert, San Francisco

Other major awards 

 NIT/Haggerty Award (Top player in New York City metro area): Ed Conlin, Fordham

Coaching changes 

A number of teams changed coaches during the season and after it ended.

References